The Mag 218 Tower is a 66-floor tower in the Dubai Marina in Dubai, United Arab Emirates. The tower has a total structural height of 231.8 m (760 ft) and 534 residential and commercial units.

History 
Construction began in 2006 and concluded in 2010. 55 of the 66 floors are residential area, the first 7 floors are used for parking. It was built by architecture firm Dar Al-Handasah and has a modern style throughout the whole design.

Gallery

See also 

 List of tallest buildings in Dubai
 List of tallest buildings in the United Arab Emirates
 List of tallest residential buildings in Dubai

References

External links 

 Emporis

Residential skyscrapers in Dubai
Residential buildings completed in 2010
2010 establishments in the United Arab Emirates